The Rouleina maderensis, also called the Madeiran smooth-head, is a species of fish in the family Alepocephalidae.

It is found worldwide.

References

Markle, D.F. and J.-C. Quéro, 1984. Alepocephalidae (including Bathylaconidae, Bathyprionidae). p. 228-253. In P.J.P. Whitehead, M.-L. Bauchot, J.-C. Hureau, J. Nielsen and E. Tortonese (eds.) Fishes of the North-eastern Atlantic and the Mediterranean. UNESCO, Paris. Vol. 1. (

Alepocephalidae
Taxa named by Günther Maul 
Fish described in 1948